Fredrik Stensøe Ulvestad (born 17 June 1992) is a Norwegian footballer who plays for Süper Lig club Sivasspor.

Career
Ulvestad started his career in the youth team of SK Herd before signing for hometown club Aalesunds FK in 2008. He made his first team debut for the club in May 2010 at the age of 17, replacing Jonathan Parr as a substitute in a 1–0 win over Volda TI in the Norwegian Football Cup. In April 2011, he scored his first goal for the club in a 1–0 win over Sogndal IL. He made his breakthrough to the first team during the 2011 season where he established himself as a regular in the side, also winning the 2011 Norwegian Football Cup in the 2–1 win over SK Brann. During his time with the club he featured in UEFA Europa League qualifiers in 2011 and 2012, however, Aalesund failed to make it to the tournament proper.

At the end of the 2014 season, Ulvestad decided not to renew his contract, and became a free agent. His final game for Aalesund was in November 2014, in the 2–1 win over Sandnes Ulf. In total he made 132 appearances for Aalesund in all competitions scoring 20 goals.

Following his departure from Aalesund, Ulvestad attracted interest from German Bundesliga side Hannover 96, before training with Premier League side Burnley in February 2015. In March 2015, he made the move permanent signing a three-year contract with the club.

On 31 August 2016, Ulvestad joined Charlton Athletic on a season long loan. Ulvestad scored his first goal for the club in a 1–1 draw against Port Vale on 18 October 2016.

On 10 May 2018 he played as Djurgården beat Malmö FF 3–0 in the Swedish Cup Final.

International career
Ulvestad was first called up for international duty for the under-23 side in November 2011, playing in the 1–1 draw with Turkey. He also made one cap for the under-20 side a year later in October 2012 in a friendly against the Netherlands. He made his debut for the under-21 side in February 2012, replacing Jonas Svensson in a 2–2 friendly draw with Slovenia. His competitive debut came in the 2013 UEFA European Under-21 Championship qualifier against Azerbaijan. He played in two further qualifiers against England and Belgium, but failed to make it into the 23-man squad that qualified for the final tournament. He played in five qualifiers for the 2015 UEFA European Under-21 Championship, however Norway failed to qualify. In total he gained 14 caps for the under-21 side. He made his debut for the senior side in August 2014, replacing Fredrik Gulbrandsen at half time in an international friendly against United Arab Emirates, finishing 0–0 in Stavanger.

Personal life
His father Rune Ulvestad played for Molde FK and Aalesunds FK during the 1980s, whilst his two other brothers Pål Erik Ulvestad and Dan Peter Ulvestad play for Norwegian Eliteserien side Kristiansund BK.

Career statistics

Club

International

Honours
Aalesund
Norwegian Football Cup: 2011

Djurgårdens IF
 Allsvenskan: 2019
 Svenska Cupen: 2017–18

Sivasspor
 Turkish Cup: 2021–22

References

External links
 Norway international stats at Fotball.no
 

Association football midfielders
Norwegian footballers
Eliteserien players
1992 births
Living people
Sportspeople from Ålesund
Aalesunds FK players
Burnley F.C. players
Charlton Athletic F.C. players
Djurgårdens IF Fotboll players
Qingdao F.C. players
Sivasspor footballers
Premier League players
English Football League players
Allsvenskan players
Chinese Super League players
Süper Lig players
Norway international footballers
Norway under-21 international footballers
Norway youth international footballers
Norwegian expatriate footballers
Expatriate footballers in England
Norwegian expatriate sportspeople in England
Expatriate footballers in Sweden
Norwegian expatriate sportspeople in Sweden
Expatriate footballers in China
Norwegian expatriate sportspeople in China
Expatriate footballers in Turkey
Norwegian expatriate sportspeople in Turkey